Michael Melissenos was a notable Byzantine aristocrat and general during the reign of Emperor Constantine V.

Biography
Michael is the first attested member of the noble Melissenos family. A favourite of Constantine V, he was given an unnamed sister of Eudokia, Constantine V's third wife, in marriage. Becoming thus a relative of the Emperor, Michael secured a prominent position in the imperial hierarchy. The couple had at least one son, Theodotos Kassiteras Melissenos, who became Patriarch of Constantinople in 815–821 as Theodotos I.

In 766/767, as part of a major reshuffle intended to place reliable and pro-iconoclast people in positions of authority, Constantine V appointed Michael as the strategos of the Anatolic Theme, at the time the Byzantine Empire's most important and powerful military post. Possibly at this time he received the dignity of patrikios, with which he is designated in the Chronicle of Theophanes the Confessor. In 771, Michael took part in an expedition against an Abbasid raid into Isauria. His troops, however, were heavily defeated, and unable to prevent the looting of the region. Nothing further is known of him.

References

Sources
 

8th-century births
Year of death unknown
8th-century Byzantine people
Byzantine generals
Byzantine Iconoclasm
Michael
Patricii
Byzantine people of the Arab–Byzantine wars
Governors of the Anatolic Theme